Events of 2020 in Tanzania.

Incumbents 

 President: John Magufuli
 Vice-President: Samia Suluhu
 Prime Minister: Kassim Majaliwa
 Chief Justice: Ibrahim Hamis Juma

Events

January
 January 31 – U.S. President Donald Trump restricts certain types of visa for Tanzanian citizens.

February
February 2 – At least 40 people are killed in a stampede at a church in Moshi, Tanzania.

May
May 3 – COVID-19 pandemic: Tanzanian President John Magufuli questions coronavirus tests after samples from a goat, a pawpaw, and a sheep tested positive. Tanzania reports 480 cases of COVID-19 and 17 deaths.

October
October 28 – 2020 Tanzanian general election: Incumbent John Magufuli is re-elected.

November
November 13 – President Magufuli re-appoints Philip Mpango as finance minister.

December
December 6 – The Alliance for Change and Transparency-Wazalendo party of Zanzibar announces it will join a national unity government with Chama Cha Mapinduzi party.

Deaths

February 
13 February – Iddi Simba, former Minister of Industry and Trade.

April 
12 April – Josephat Torner, albino activist (b. 1977 or 1978).
20 April – Gertrude Rwakatare, pastor, politician and MP (b. 1950).
25 April – Abdulkarim Shah, former politician and MP (b. 1961).
28 April – Augustino Ramadhani, politician and former Chief Justice of Tanzania (b. 1945).
29 April – Richard Ndassa, politician and MP (b. 1959).

May 
1 May – Augustine Mahiga, diplomat and politician, former Minister of Foreign Affairs and Permanent Representative to the UN (b. 1945).

July 
24 July – Benjamin Mkapa, politician and the third President of Tanzania (b. 1938).

September
September 10 – Mark Bomani, 88, jurist, Attorney General (1965–1976).
14 September – Salim Turky, 57, businessman and MP.

November
5 November – Cyril Chami, 56, former MP and Minister for Industry, Trade and Marketing.

December
December 21 – Anthony Banzi, 74, Roman Catholic prelate, Bishop of Tanga (since 1994).

See also

2020–21 South-West Indian Ocean cyclone season
COVID-19 pandemic in Tanzania
COVID-19 pandemic in Africa
2020 in East Africa
2020 in Kenya
2020 in Mozambique
2020 in Zambia

References 

 

 
Tanzania